Al-Ahli Saudi Football Club is a Saudi Arabian professional football club based in Jeddah, that competes in the Saudi First Division League, following their relegation from the Saudi Professional League in the 2021–22 season. The club was founded in 1937.

Domestically, Al-Ahli has won three Saudi Professional Leagues, holds the record of 13 King's Cups, six Crown Prince Cups, one General League Shield, and one Super Cup. In international club football, they have won a record equal of 3 GCC Champions League and 1 Arab Club Championship. The first Saudi club to win the league and the King's Cup in the same season in 1968, and is the only club that did it twice - in 1978 and 2016.

Al-Ahli was one of the four founding members of the Saudi Pro League and had never been relegated from the top flight until the 2021–22 season. The other three are Al-Hilal, Al-Ittihad, and Al-Nassr. Al-Ahli hold the record for the longest unbeaten run in the league with their 51-match unbeaten streak from 2014 to 2016.

Al-Ahli's home games are played at King Abdullah Sports City, also known as the shining jewel Stadium. The stadium, which is shared with long-lasting city rivals Al-Ittihad, is the second-largest stadium in Saudi Arabia, with a total capacity of approximately 63,000.

The club's most famous Saudi players are Taisir Al-Jassim, Khalid Massad, Amin Dabo, Mohamed Abd Al-Jawad, Malek Mouath, and Yasser Al Mosailem; the most famous foreign players are Omar Al Somah, Victor Simões, Nabil Maâloul, Imad Al Hosni, and Mohamed Barakat.

History

Founded in 1937 by four young men, the Al Ahli Club is located in the heart of Jeddah, and serves as a sports beacon. It's strategically located on Jeddahs largest street, Prince Mohammed bin Abdul Aziz Street. The idea of Al-Ahli was conceived by students in Al-Falah school. Al-Falah is the oldest school in the city of Jeddah.

Prince Khalid bin Abdullah bin Abdul Aziz, Chairman of the Honorary Members and Honorary Members of the club throughout its history, became a manager of the club while it was headed by Abdul Aziz Al Anqari. This was a historic day in Al Ahli Saudi FC's history, especially for Al Ahlawy, Al-Ahlis ultras. This was considered an honor, and happened shortly after the coach's unique achievement in the same year, 2008. He achieved four foreign championships with the handball team that won the Asian Club League Handball Championship.

The former Brazilian coach, Telê Santana coached Al-Ahli from 1983 to 1985 and won two titles, the League in 1984 and the King Cup in 1983. Al-Ahli has played in eighteen King Cup finals. They've won thirteen of them and lost five.

From 2014 to 2016, under the management of Swiss coach Christian Gross, the team won four titles with him. 2014–15 Saudi Crown Prince Cup, 2015–16 Saudi Professional League and 2016 King Cup. Al-Ahli has won every major competition in which it has competed, with the exception of the AFC Champions League (in this competition they have lost two finals, in 1985–86 Asian Club Championship and 2012 AFC Champions League. They were also the first Saudi Club to play in the Asian Final. Al Ahli is one of the big four clubs in Saudi Arabia along with Al Hilal, Al Nasser, and their local rivals Al Ittihad.

Shield of Sports Excellence and the title of ambassador of the homeland

In 2009, the club celebrated 75 years of historical achievements. On 3 July 2009, the Custodian of the Two Holy Mosques King Abdullah bin Abdul Aziz received the heads and members of the honor of the club and its board of directors, on the occasion of Al-Ahli winning four International titles in 2008. The club was awarded the highest honor; it was presented with the shield of the Custodian of the Two Holy Mosques for sports excellence, and the title "Ambassador of the Homeland".

Honours

Domestic 

Saudi Professional League:
Champions:1977–78, 1983–84, 2015–16
Runners-up: 1989–90, 1995–96, 1998–99, 1999–2000, 2002–03, 2011–12, 2014–15, 2016–17, 2017–18
King Cup:
Winners: 1962, 1965, 1969, 1970, 1971, 1973, 1977, 1978, 1979, 1983, 2011, 2012, 2016
Runners-up: 1974, 1976, 1984, 2014, 2017
Saudi Super Cup:
Winners: 2016
Crown Prince Cup:
Winners: 1957, 1970, 1998, 2002, 2006–07, 2014–15
Runners-up: 1958, 1974, 2003, 2004, 2006, 2009–10, 2015–16
Saudi Federation Cup:
Winners: 2001, 2002, 2007
Runners-up: 1976, 1989, 1991, 1997
General League Shield
Winners: 1969
Saudi Founder's Cup:
Runners-up: 1999
Domestic Treble
Winners: 2016
Double
Winners: 1970, 1978, 2007

International
AFC Champions League:
Runners-up: 1985–86, 2012
Arab Champions League:
Winners: 2002–03
Gulf Club Champions Cup:
Winners: 1985, 2002, 2008

Winners: 2001, 2002
Runners-up: 1997, 1999

Kits and crest

Kit suppliers and shirt sponsors

Players

As of 25 January 2023:

Out on loan

Records

Asian record

Overview

Record by country

Matches

Notes
 QR: Qualifying round
 1Q: First qualifying round
 2Q: Second qualifying round
 3Q: Third qualifying round
 PO: Play-off round
 A  After extra time.

Top scorers in Asian competitions

Recent seasons 
{|class="wikitable"  style="text-align: center;"
|-
!Season!!Div.!!Pos.!!Pl.!!W!!D!!L!!GS!!GA!!GD!!P!!KC!!CPC!!PFC!!ARCL!!CL!!GCC!!Saudi Super Cup!!colspan=2|Top scorer!!Manager
|-
|2000–01
| bgcolor=|SPL||1||22||15||6||1||50||19||31+||51
| –
| Quarter-finals
| style="background:Gold;"|Winners
| Semi-finals
| –
| –
| –
|  Ibrahim Al-Suwayyed
| 12
|  Luka Peruzović
|-
|2001–02
| bgcolor=|SPL||4||22||12||4||6||39||26||13+||40
| –
| style="background:Gold;"|Winners
| style="background:Gold;"|Winners
| –
| –
| style="background:Gold;"|Winners
| –
|  Obeid Al-Dosari
| 11
|  Luka Peruzović Yousef Anbar
|-
|2002–03
| style="background:Silver;"|SPL||2||22||15||2||5||54||23||31+||47
| –
| style="background:Silver;"|Runners-up
| style="background:Silver;"|Runners-up
| style="background:Gold;"|Winners
| 3rd Qualifying Round
| –
| –
|  Mohammed Barakat
| 10
|  Dimitri Davidovic Ilija Lukić
|-
|2003–04
| style="background:#c96;"|SPL||4||22||10||8||4||31||21||10+||38
| –
| style="background:Silver;"|Runner-up
| Group stage
| Group stage
| –
| –
| –
|  Rojero Pereira
| 11
|  Pierre Lechantre Valmir Louruz
|-
|2004–05
| bgcolor=|SPL||5||22||10||8||4||41||21||20+||34
| –
| Round 16
| Semi-finals
| Semi-finals
| Quarter-finals
| –
| –
|  Rojero Pereira
| 13
|  Valmir Louruz Geninho
|-
|2005–06
| bgcolor=|SPL||4||22||9||9||4||45||23||22+||36
| –
| style="background:Silver;"|Runners-up
| style="background:Silver;"|Runners-up
| –
| –
| –
| –
|  Abdelhaq Ait Laarif Malek Mouath
| 8
|  Ilija Lukić Nebojša Vučković
|-
|2006–07
| bgcolor=|SPL||5||22||7||8||7||29||33||−4||29
| –
| style="background:Gold;"|Winners
| style="background:Gold;"|Winners
| Semi-finals
| –
| –
| –
|  Malek Mouath
| 20
|  Nebojša Vučković
|-
|2007–08
| SPL||8||22||7||5||10||30||31||−1||26
| Quarter-finals
| Semi-finals
| Semi-finals
| –
| Group stage
| –
| –
|  Malek Mouath
| 14
|  Nebojša Vučković Yousef Anbar
|-
|2008–09
| style="background:#c96;"|SPL||3||22||11||7||4||33||20||+13||40
| Quarter-finals
| Round 16
| Group stage
| –
| –
| style="background:Gold;"|Winner
| –
|  Hassan Al-Raheb
| 10
|  Stoycho Mladenov
|-
|2009–10
| bgcolor=|ZPL||6||22||7||7||8||28||29||−1||28
| Quarter-finals
| style="background:Silver;"|Runners-up
| Semi-finals
| –
| Group stage
| –
| –
|  Victor Simões
| 13
|  Gustavo Alfaro Farias
|-
|2010–11
| bgcolor=|ZPL||6||26||11||4||11||48||41||+7||37
| style="background:Gold;"|Winners
| Quarter-final
| style="background:Silver;"|Runners-up
| –
| –
| –
| –
|  Victor Simões
| 20
|  Trond Sollied Milovan Rajevac Aleksandar Ilić
|-
|2011–12
| style="background:Silver;"|ZPL||2||26||19||5||2||60||22||+38||62
| style="background:Gold;"|Winners
| Semi-final
| style="background:Gold;"|Winners
| –
| style="background:Silver;"|Runners-up
| –
| –
|  Victor Simões
| 27
|  Karel Jarolím
|-
|2012–13
|ZPL||5||26||12||8||6||51||33||+18||44
| Semi-finals
| Quarter-finals
| style="background:Gold;"|Winners
| –
| Quarter-finals
| –
| –
|  Victor Simões
| 17
|  Karel Jarolím Aleksandar Ilić
|-
|2013–14
| style="background:#c96;"|ALJ||3||26||12||9||5||48||24||+24||45
| style="background:Silver;"|Runners-up
| Quarter-finals
| style="background:Silver;"|Runners-up
| –
| –
| –
| –
|  Taisir Al-Jassim
| 9
|  Vítor Pereira
|-
|2014–15
|style="background:Silver;"|ALJ||2||26||17||9||0||59||22||+37||60
|Round 16
| style="background:Gold;"|Winners
|
| –
| Round 16
| –
| –
|  Omar Al Somah
| 31
|  Christian Gross
|-
|2015–16
|style="background:Gold;"|ALJ||1||26||19||6||1||55||21||+34||63
|style="background:Gold;"|Winners
| style="background:Silver;"|Runners-up
| –
| –
| Group stages
| –
| –
|  Omar Al Somah
| 34
|  Christian Gross
|-
|2016–17
|style="background:Silver;"|ALJ||2||26||17||4||5||57||30||+27||55
|style="background:Silver;"|Runners-up
| Semi-finals
| –
| –
| Quarter-finals
| –
|style="background:Gold;"|Winners
|  Omar Al Soma
| 40
|  José Manuel Gomes Christian Gross
|-
|2017–18
|style="background:Silver;"|SPL||2||26||16||7||3||59||26||+33||55
| Semi-finals
| –
| –
| –
| Round of 16
| –
| –
|  Muhannad Assiri
| 13
|  Serhii Rebrov
|-
|2018–19
|SPL||4||30||17||4||9||68||41||+27||55
| Round of 16
| –
| –
| Semi-finals
| Round of 16
| –
| –
|  Omar Al Somah
| 27
|  Pablo Guede Jorge Fossati Yousef Anbar
|}

Player of the Year

Staff and management

Technical staff

Source:

Board members

Source:

Presidents

Managers

  Mohammed Amin Hilmi (1937–39), (1950–51)
  Abdullah Abdul Majid (1961–65), (1969–71), (1976–77)
  Ahmed Saleh Al Yafei (1961–65), (1976–77)
  Mr. Michael (1967)
  Oscar Hold (1967–70)
  Hassan Sadaqa (1970–xx)
  Taha Ismail (1972–76)
  Didi (1978–81)
  Jorge Vieira (1980–81)
  Carlos the Jackal (1981–82)
  Telê Santana (1983–85)
  Mahmoud El-Gohary (1985, 1986–88)
  Ahmed Bouajila (1985–1986)
  Eckhard Krautzun (1988–89)
  Sebastião Lazaroni (1989–90)
  Zanata (1990, 1997)
  Xanana (1990–91), (1998–99), (2000–01)
  Luiz Felipe Scolari (1992–93)
  Nabil Maaloul (1994)
  Peter Shtoob (1994)
  Ahmed Al-Saghir (1994–95)
  Márcio Máximo (1995)
  Luís Antônio Zaluar (1995–96)
  Vantuir (1996–97)
  Cabralzinho (3 Oct 1998 – 3 Dec 1998)
  Amin Dabo (3 Dec 1998 – 21 Nov 1999)
  Zanata (21 Nov 1999 – 31 May 2000)
  Miguel Ángel López (22 Jun 2000 – 11 Oct 2000)
  Luka Peruzović (12 Oct 2000 – 11 Apr 2002)
  Yousef Anbar (caretaker) (11 Apr 2002 – 31 May 2002, 19 Nov 2005 – 22 Dec 2005, 2 Oct 2007 – 22 Oct 2007, 6 Apr 2008 – 22 May 2008, 4 Sep 2022 – 25 Sep 2022)
  Dimitri Davidovic (21 Jun 2002 – 4 Jan 2003)
  Ilija Lukić (4 Jan 2003 – 1 Jun 2003, 30 Jul 2005 – 19 Nov 2005)
  Pierre Lechantre (15 Jul 2003 – 30 Sep 2003)
  Valmir Louruz (6 Oct 2003 – 20 Dec 2004)
  Geninho (25 Dec 2004 – 17 Jul 2005)
  Nebojsa Vučković (22 Dec 2005 – 22 May 2007, 22 Oct 2007 – 6 Apr 2008)
  Theo Bücker (30 May 2007 – 2 Oct 2007)
  Stoycho Mladenov (7 July 2008 – 8 May 2009)
  Gustavo Alfaro (1 June 2009 – 25 Nov 2009)
  Alan Guido (caretaker) (25 Nov 2009 – 25 Dec 2009)
  Sérgio Farias (25 Dec 2009 – 1 Jul 2010)
  Trond Sollied (1 Jul 2010 – 28 Aug 2010)
  Khaled Badra (caretaker) (28 Aug 2010 – Sept 10, 2010)
  Milovan Rajevac (Sept 10, 2010 – 20 Feb 2011)
  Aleksandar Ilić (24 Feb 2011 – 30 Jun 2011, 28 Feb 2013 – 31 May 2013)
  Karel Jarolím (5 Aug 2011 – 28 Feb 2013)
  Vítor Pereira (9 Jun 2013 – 5 May 2014)
  Christian Gross (16 Jun 2014 – 30 May 2016)
  José Manuel Gomes (31 May 2016 – 30 Sep 2016)
  Christian Gross (3 Oct 2016 – 31 May 2017)
  Serhii Rebrov (21 Jun 2017 – 19 Apr 2018)
  Fathi Al-Jabal (19 Apr 2018 – 15 May 2018)
  Pablo Guede (15 May 2018 – 5 Feb 2019)
  Jorge Fossati (8 Feb 2019 – 17 Apr 2019)
  Yousef Anbar (17 Apr 2019 – 21 May 2019)
  Branko Ivanković (18 Jun 2019 – 16 Sep 2019)
  Saleh Al-Mohammadi (caretaker) (16 Sep 2019 – 16 Oct 2019)
  Christian Gross (16 Oct 2019 – 17 Feb 2020)
  Mazen Bahkali (caretaker) (17 Feb 2020 – 28 Feb 2020)
  Vladan Milojević (28 Feb 2020 – 24 Mar 2021)
  Faiçal Gormi (caretaker) (24 Mar 2021 – 31 Mar 2021)
  Laurențiu Reghecampf (31 Mar 2021 – 31 May 2021)
  Besnik Hasi (6 Jun 2021 – 4 Mar 2022)
  Robert Siboldi (5 Mar 2022 – 4 Sep 2022)
  Pitso Mosimane (25 Sep 2022 – )

References

External links

 Official website

 
Ahli
Association football clubs established in 1937
Football clubs in Jeddah
1937 establishments in Saudi Arabia